The National United Front of Kampuchea ( or , FUNK;) was an organisation formed by the deposed then Chief of State of Cambodia, Norodom Sihanouk in 1970 while he was in exile in Beijing.

History
The front was supposed to be an umbrella organization of forces that opposed Lon Nol's seizure of power; however, the Communist Party of Kampuchea/Khmer Rouge guerrillas formed the basic military force of the Front. Apart from the communists, there were two distinct factions that participated in the insurgency: the pro-Sihanouk royalists (Khmer Rumdos), who never held real power in the front, and secondly, the pro-North Vietnamese cadres of Khmer Issarak.

The territories controlled by the guerrillas were nominally led by a Royal United National Government of Kampuchea (GRUNK). The government was based in Beijing. Sihanouk remained the head of state in that government, Penn Nouth was the prime minister and Khieu Samphan the deputy prime minister, minister of defense and commander-in-chief of  the GRUNK forces. The possibility to exploit peasant masses' traditional adherence to Cambodia's monarchs greatly helped the Khmer Rouge to recruit members to the front. China, the USSR and North Vietnam backed the 'Royal Government', whereas North Vietnamese retained a more pro-Sihanouk stance as the Khmer Rouge began to consolidate their positions in 1971. The deposed king remained a figurehead of the front and nominal head of state until Khmer Rouge victory over Lon Nol in 1975.

NUFK Central Committee
On 5 May 1970, the politburo members of the NUFK Central Committee were:
Chairman: Penn Nouth
Politburo members:
Chau Seng (Khmer Rouge)
Hu Nim (Khmer Rouge)
Major Gen. Duong Sam Ol (Royal Cambodian Army)
Huot Sambath
Chan Youran
Khieu Samphan (Khmer Rouge)
Chea San
Sarin Chhak
Hou Yuon (Khmer Rouge)
Thiounn Mumm

Footnotes

See also
Cambodian Civil War
Viet Minh
Khmer Rouge
Coalition Government of Democratic Kampuchea
Kampuchean United Front for National Salvation
Patriotic and Democratic Front of the Great National Union of Kampuchea

Bibliography
Milton Osborne, Sihanouk, Prince of Light, Prince of Darkness. Silkworm 1994

External links
Political programme of the National United Front of Kampuchea (NUFK) : (adopted unanimously by the Congress held in Peking on Sunday, May 3, 1970) 
The Armed struggle and life of the Khmer people in the liberated areas in pictures.

Defunct political parties in Cambodia
Factions of the Vietnam War
Guerrilla organizations
Khmer Rouge
Popular fronts of communist states
Rebel groups in Cambodia
Political parties established in 1970
Cambodian Civil War